JFA may refer to:

Football associations 
 Japan Football Association
 Jersey Football Association
 Johor Football Association
 Jordan Football Association

Other uses 
 JFA (band), an American hardcore punk band
 Jazz Foundation of America
 Jewish Future Alliance
 Judo Federation of Australia
 Junkers-Fokker Aktiengesellschaft or Jfa, a collaborative aircraft manufacturere in Imperial German; see Junkers 
Phoenix Wright: Ace Attorney − Justice for All, a 2002 video game
Jump Flooding Algorithm